The paloma (Spanish for "dove") is a tequila-based cocktail. This drink is most commonly prepared by mixing tequila, lime juice, and a grapefruit-flavored soda such as Fresca, Squirt, or Jarritos and served on the rocks with a lime wedge. Adding salt to the rim of the glass is also an option.

Alternatively, the grapefruit soda can be replaced with fresh white or red grapefruit juice (jugo de toronja) and club soda (sugar optional).

A simple paloma is a two-ingredient cocktail consisting only of tequila and grapefruit-flavored soda. A more complex variant of the Paloma is the cantarito, which in addition to lime juice, also has lemon juice and orange juice.

The paloma is more flavorful than its closest relative, the greyhound, which consists of grapefruit juice and either gin or vodka mixed and served over ice.

See also
 Lonkero
 List of cocktails

References

External links

Cocktails with tequila
Cocktails with grapefruit soda 
Mexican alcoholic drinks
Three-ingredient cocktails
Bubbly cocktails
Citrus cocktails
Sour cocktails
Sweet cocktails